Guillermo Velasquez may refer to:

Guillermo Velasquez (baseball), Mexican-born former Major League Baseball player
Guillermo Velasquez (football referee), Colombian-born football referee

de:Guillermo Velásquez